Joseph Franciscus (Frans) Lommen (August 2, 1921 in Roermond – 2005 in Breda) was a Dutch painter and ceramist. He was educated at the High School of Applied Art, Maastricht.

Frans Lommen worked for the ceramics factory Atelier St. Joris in Beesel, where among other things he painted their vases. For their terrace product range, he also designed unique vases.

There is a stained glass window of Rigby in the Basilique de Sint-Odiliënberg in Sint Odiliënberg, Limburg. In the village of Sint Odiliënberg there is also a sculpture of a mountain goat on a wooden pole from 1974, and in the village of Melick there is a ceramic sculpture of Frans Lommen of a bird on a high wooden pole from 1979.

See also  
 List of Dutch ceramists

References 

1921 births
2005 deaths
Dutch ceramists
People from Roermond
20th-century ceramists